Sylvester Ateteng Azantilow was a Ghanaian politician and a member of the First Parliament of the Fourth Republic representing the Builsa North Constituency in the Upper East Region of Ghana. He was a member of the National Democratic Congress.

Early life and education 
Azantilow was born in the year 1951 in the Upper East Region of Ghana (then Gold Coast). He attended the Notre Dame Seminary Senior High School, Navrongo, where he obtained his GCE Ordinary Level.

Politics 
Azantilow was elected into parliament on the ticket of the National Democratic Congress during the 1992 Ghanaian parliamentary election to represent the Builsa North constituency in the Upper East Region. He was succeeded by Theodore Basil Anuka. During the 1996 Ghanaian general election, he polled 12,794 votes out of the total valid votes cast representing 56.10% over his opponents Avaasi Solomon Akumboa who polled 3,440 votes representing 15.10%, Atulisi Alakawon Andrew who polled 837 votes representing 3.70%, Azaanab Waksman Akuobey who polled 524 votes representing 2.30% and George Kwado Amarnah who polled 317 votes representing 1.40%.

Career 
Azantilow was an Imports Officer by profession and a former member of parliament for the Builsa North Constituency in the Upper East Region. He was also the Deputy Minister of Youth and Sports.

Personal life 
Azantilow was a Christian.

Death 
Azantilow died on 21 July 2020 and was buried on 8 August at the Royal Burial Grounds in Sandema.

References 

1951 births
2020 deaths
National Democratic Congress (Ghana) politicians
People from Upper East Region
Ghanaian MPs 1993–1997
Ghanaian Christians